The Buick Special was an automobile produced by Buick. It was usually Buick's lowest-priced model, starting out as a full-size car in 1936 and returning in 1961 (after a two-year hiatus) as a mid-size. The Special was built for several decades and was offered as a coupe, sedan and later as a station wagon. When GM modernized their entry level products in the 1960s, the Special introduced the modern Buick V6 that became a core engine for GM for several decades and lived on in upgraded form until 2006.

By 1970, Special was no longer offered as a standalone model but the name would later be used for the entry trim on 1975 to 1979 and 1991 to 1996 Century models.

The entry level Buick can trace its heritage to the Buick Model 10, a companion to Buick's first car, the Buick Model B. The Model 10 started out as one of the independent brands merged into Buick, called the Janney.

Series 40 (1930, 1934–1935)

When the Series 40 was introduced, it had the  overhead valve Buick Straight-6 engine that produced 80.5 bhp of power at 2,800 rpm, and 74,257 examples were made, being the highest number of Buicks for 1930. For the year 1931, the Series 40 was temporarily discontinued, with the introduction of the Marquette Model 30 and the Series 50 being repositioned as the Buick entry level product. The 1935 version returned with the  Buick Straight-8 engine and 93 bhp. Starting with this generation, all GM cars shared a corporate appearance as a result of the Art and Color Section headed by Harley Earl and modest yearly changes were introduced to freshen the appearance. 

1933 was the first year all GM vehicles were installed with optional vent windows which were initially called “No Draft Individually Controlled Ventilation” later renamed "Ventiplanes" which the patent application was filed on Nov. 28, 1932. It was assigned to the Ternstedt Manufacturing Company, a GM subsidiary that manufactured components for Fisher Body and they were added to the Special when it was introduced in 1935. Additional manufacturing locations also opened across the country under the Buick-Oldsmobile-Pontiac Assembly Division. The Series 40 was the most affordable Buick offered, with 6 body styles offered, and the five passenger Sedan Model 41 was US$925 ($ in  dollars ), while a LaSalle Series 50 was US$1,000 ($ in  dollars ) more. A standard feature offered on all Buicks was a dashboard mounted selector handle that would alter spark timing and allow either low grade or premium fuel to be used. In 1936 the name changed to "Special".

1936–1942, 1946-1949

Starting with 1936, the Buick Special Series 40 model range represented the marque's entry level full-size automobile. The '36 was a very successful year for Buick and also marked the first time of using names rather than the simple serial numbers which had been in use before. The Special (and all other Buicks as well) underwent a full restyling for 1939, with a more enclosed nose and a wider grille. The wheelbase was also two inches shorter. 

For 1940, there was the usual restyle and the wheelbase increased by an inch. This was also the only model year that a four-door convertible Special ("Sport Phaeton") was offered, although only 552 were built. Prices started at US$795 ($ in  dollars ) for the Business Coupe to US$925 ($ in  dollars ) for either the 4-door Touring Sedan or 2-door Convertible.

For 1941 the bodywork was again all new, with the front fenders now very closely integrated into the cars overall design. The Estate Wagon migrated from being a Super into the Special lineup. A fastback was offered in Century and 40 Special trim as a four-door touring sedan and two-door business coupe and the 46S sedanette. Also new was the 40-A series (the regular Special now being the 40-B), a version on a three inches shorter wheelbase which shared its body with the 1941 Oldsmobile Series 70. These two series, with a restyle reminiscent of the 1939 Y-Job, continued into the abbreviated 1942 model year. Production ended on 4 February 1942. The Special was now offered as the entry-level luxury vehicle that the LaSalle previously held.

After production resumed, only the larger 1946 B-body Special range remained available, which is rare, representing less than two percent of Buick's production that year. The Special continued with minor changes until the prewar body was finally replaced halfway through the 1949 model year. Post-war Specials were only available as a four-door sedan or a two-door "sedanet", until the new 1949 models arrived.

In the movie Mildred Pierce, Veda Pierce, Mildred's daughter, played by actress Ann Blyth, was given a 1940 Buick Special convertible as a gift, valued at US$1,077 for the Model 46C ($ in  dollars ).

The movie Small Town Conspiracy features a 1939 Buick Special 8 that the main character of the film John Haleran (Zen Gesner) drives as his official police car. The car remained the property of director Ralph Clemente and was untouched for many years until sold to Florida restorer and car collector Axel Caravias.

1949–1958

Halfway into the 1949 model year, the Specials received all-new bodywork to include a dramatically styled grille where nine grille bars also served as bumper guards and extended over the front bumper, and the first fully postwar design for the series. New was also the 40D-series, a better equipped version called the Special DeLuxe. A two-door hardtop coupe was also new for 1951, but the unusual grille was revised with the grill bars shortened. The 1954 Specials had an all-new body and chassis, much wider and lower, and were now equipped with the all-new, more powerful "Fireball" V8 engines. In 1953 The Buick-Berle Show introduced product placement commercials on TV, and later in 1955 The Honeymooners was one of the sponsors.

Introduced in the middle of the 1955 model year the four-door Buick Special Riviera (along with the Century Riviera, the Oldsmobile 98 Holiday, and the 88 Holiday) were the first four-door pillarless hardtops ever produced. By then, the Buick Special was one of America's best selling automotive series. For 1956 the larger  V8 engine was shared with the rest of the range, although it was replaced by the bigger,  364 V8 for 1957. This year also brought all-new bodywork, as well as a four-door hardtop station wagon called the Buick Riviera Estate. The 1957 wheelbase remained 122 inches.

1949-1957 Buick Specials had three VentiPorts on each side while more senior Buicks (with the partial exception of the Buick Super, which switched from three to four in 1955) had four. Earlier versions had a "Sweepspear" inspired character line alongside the body, while later versions had the "Sweepspear" moulding attached to the side of all models. GM renamed the Buick Special the LeSabre for the 1959 model year, taking the name from the 1951 Le Sabre concept car.

1961–1963

In 1961, the car returned after a short absence of two years, but this time it was on the brand new unibody compact GM Y platform. The Special was powered by a  innovative aluminum-block 215 in³ V8, and had Dual Path transmission and power steering. In mid-year a Skylark option was released with special trim, optional bucket seats and a four-barrel version of the 215 that made .

In 1962, the Special was the first American car to use a V6 engine in volume production; it earned Motor Trends Car of the Year for 1962. This 198 cid Fireball was engineered down from the 215 and used many of the same design parameters, but was cast in iron. In their test that year, Road & Track was impressed with Buick's "practical" new V6, saying it "sounds and performs exactly like the aluminum V8 in most respects." In 1963, the Special's body was restyled. Mechanically, however, the car was identical to the 1962 model. There was also some minor interior restyling, particularly to the dash and instrument cluster. The 1963 Special was available as a 2-door pillared hardtop coupe, a four dour sedan, a convertible, and a station wagon. Transmission choices were a three speed column shift manual transmission, a floor shift Borg-Warner T-10 four-speed manual, or a two-speed Turbine Drive automatic. The two speed "Dual Path Turbine Drive" automatic was a Buick design and shared no common parts with the better known Chevrolet Power-Glide transmission.

The 1962 model sold 153,763, including 42,973 Skylarks.

The 1963 body was only produced for one year; it sold 148,750 copies, including 42,321 Skylarks. The entire car was redesigned for 1964. After that, the 215 found its way into the Rover P6 3500S in 1968, but was never sold in North America in any great numbers. It was also employed in other British cars, including the Morgan Plus 8, MG MGB GTV8, Land Rover, and Triumph TR8, as well as retrofits into MGAs and MGBs. The engine had really earned its stripes as being the sole engine powering the Range Rover for a couple decades and eventually finding its way into the original Series/Defender Land Rover; and several other Land Rover Models including the Discovery and the Forward Control.

The Skylark became a separate series for 1962.

1964–1967

The Special, along with the upscale Skylark, were redesigned for the 1964 model year with separate body-on-frame construction—renamed the A-body—and marketed as an intermediate-sized car. The Skylark was expanded to a full top-line series that now included two- and four-door sedans, two-door hardtop coupe and convertible, along with a station wagon. The other series models included the base Special and the slightly fancier Special Deluxe, in a more limited range of bodystyles.

Also new for 1964 were engines. The capacity of the V6 engine was increased from 198 to 225 cubic inches, while the aluminum V8 was replaced by a new cast iron-block 300 cubic inch V8 with aluminum cylinder heads. In 1965, cast iron heads replaced the problematic aluminum ones. This reliable engine, produced until 1967, was based on the aluminum V8, and many parts (such as the cylinder heads) were interchangeable.

1968–1969

The Special nameplate was used on lower-priced intermediate-sized Buicks through the 1969 model year. In 1968 and 1969, the Buick Special was dropped and only Special Deluxes were manufactured. In 1970, the end of the Special came about when the Special Deluxe was dropped too in favor of the slightly upscale Buick Skylark. 

The 1968 model year was one of significant change for the Buick Special and Skylark. Although still using the same basic chassis, all of GM's mid-sized cars adopted a policy of using two different length wheelbases. All of GM's mid-sized cars received all-new sheet metal, incorporating a semi-fastback appearance, which was a revival of a streamlining on all GM products from 1942 until 1950 as demonstrated on the Buick Super Club Coupe (sedanette). More Federally mandated safety features improved occupant protection and accident avoidance, including side marker lights, shoulder belts (on all models built after January 1, 1968), and parking lights that illuminated with headlights. 

In a reshuffling of models in the lineup, the Special Deluxe replaced the previous Special. The Skylark nameplate was shuffled down a notch to replace the previous Special Deluxe. The previous Skylark was replaced by a new Skylark Custom. 

The Special Deluxe was available as a pillared two-door coupe, a pillared four-door sedan, or a 2-row station wagon. 

The previous V6 was discontinued and the associated tooling was sold to Kaiser Industries, which used the V6 in its Jeep trucks and sport utility vehicles. The base engine in the Buick Special (and Buick Skylark) coupes & sedans) became a 250-cubic-inch  Chevrolet I6, that produced  at 4200 rpm using a single-barrel Rochester carburetor. 

Optional on the Special Deluxe coupe & sedan and standard on the Special Deluxe station wagon was a new 350-cubic-inch V8 derived from the 340, using a two-barrel Rochester carburetor that produced  at 4400 rpm. Optional on the Special Deluxe was a 350-cubic-inch V8 using a four-barrel Rochester carburetor that produced  at 4600 rpm. The Buick Special name was dropped after the 1969 model year. A locking steering column with a new, rectangular ignition key became standard on all 1969 GM cars (except Corvair), one year ahead of the Federal requirement. 

For 1970, the Buick Skylark name was moved down another notch, replacing the previous entry-level Buick Special.

1975–1977

The Special returned briefly to the GM A platform as an entry level subseries of the Buick Century.  Although officially sold as the Buick Century Special, it was sometimes also referred to as just the Buick Special.

Century Specials were usually powered by Buick's own 231 V6; a V8 (from either Buick, Oldsmobile, or Chevrolet) was offered but rarely optioned. It used the "colonnade" roofline but was fitted with a landau roof that covered most of the rear quarter windows. The opening that was left was the same shape as the windows on the higher series formal-roof cars.

1978–1979

In 1978 and 1979, the Special trim continued on the redesigned Century fastback and wagon models.

1991–1996

Special returned once again as the entry level trim on the Century sedan (starting 1991) and wagon (starting 1993).  The "Special" designation was discontinued with the Century's redesign in 1997.

References

Special
Buick Special
Buick Special
Buick Special
Buick Special
Rear-wheel-drive vehicles
Buick Special
Motor vehicles manufactured in the United States